Wilhelm "Willi" Wülbeck (born 18 December 1954) is a retired German middle-distance runner. Competing in the 800 m he finished fourth at the 1976 Summer Olympics. He missed the 1980 Moscow Olympics due to the West German boycott and could not participate in the 1984 Summer Olympics because of an injury. He also finished eighth at the 1974 and 1982 European Championships.

His greatest success came as he won the gold medal at the 1983 World Championships in Helsinki. Wülbeck ran a time of 1:43.65 which remains the German record. In the 1500 metres his personal best time was 3:33.74 minutes, achieved in August 1980 in Koblenz. This result places him seventh on the German all-time performers list.

Wülbeck won ten consecutive West German championships over 800 m (1974–1983), an unprecedented achievement. He received multiple national awards, including the Silver Bay Leaf in 1980, the Rudolf Harbig Memorial Award in 1984, and the Sports Badge of North Rhine Westphalia in 1983. In 2002 he was an ambassador for the unsuccessful German 2012 Olympic bid.

Wülbeck studied biology and sports and after retiring from competitions become a sports teacher. He later worked as a public relation consultant for a sporting goods enterprise and as a freelance sports journalist. He also founded a sports school and a public relations agency in Duisburg. From 1992 to 2006 he headed the athletics department at ASV Duisburg.

References

External links

 
 
 

1954 births
Living people
Sportspeople from Oberhausen
West German male middle-distance runners
Athletes (track and field) at the 1976 Summer Olympics
Olympic athletes of West Germany
World Athletics Championships medalists
World Athletics Championships winners